Clingman is a surname. Notable people with the surname include:

Billy Clingman (1869–1958), American baseball player
Gary L. Clingman (born 1951), American judge
Thomas Lanier Clingman (1812–1897), American politician